The Tenerife International Film Music Festival (Fimucité) is an international film music festival that is held in Santa Cruz de Tenerife on the island of Tenerife in the Canary Islands.

The event brings industry leaders from both Europe and the Americas and often features music from award winning movies. The festival is held in important cultural centers throughout Santa Cruz de Tenerife including the Auditorio de Tenerife, Espacio Cultural CajaCanarias, Teatro Guimerá and Tenerife Espacio de las Artes.

See also 

 Santa Cruz de Tenerife
 Auditorio de Tenerife
 Orquesta Sinfónica de Tenerife

References

External links 
  
 
 

Santa Cruz de Tenerife
Canarian culture
Film festivals in Spain
Tourist attractions in Tenerife